The Rhode Island Avenue–New Carrollton Line, designated Route T14, is a daily bus route operated by the Washington Metropolitan Area Transit Authority between the New Carrollton station of the Orange Line of the Washington Metro and Rhode Island Avenue–Brentwood station of the Red Line of the Washington Metro. The line operates every 20–25 during the peak periods and 60 minutes during the weekday middays and on the weekends. Route T14 trips roughly take 50 minutes.

Background
Route T14 operates daily between New Carrollton station and Rhode Island Avenue stations primarily running into neighborhoods unlike route T18 which is a direct route. The line also operates a limited stop segment between Mount Rainier Terminal and Rhode Island Avenue alongside routes G9 and T18 at all times serving only five stops. Local service is provided by routes 83 and 86.

Route T14 currently operates out of Landover division.

T14 stops

History
Route T14 was originally named the Bowie-Belair Line and operated alongside the former route T12 Route between Rhode Island Avenue-Brentwood station and Bowie State University, between March 27, 1976, when both routes were created as brand new Metrobus Routes. Then on December 3, 1978, when New Carrollton station opened, both routes T12 & T14 were truncated to only operate between New Carrollton station & Bowie State University. In the early 1990s, the line was discontinued and replaced by routes B24, B25, and B27.

Routes 84 and 85 operated alongside much of exactly the same routing, even when both routes were still streetcar routes that had yet to become Metrobus routes with route 84 operating daily and route 85 operating peak hours only. Routes 84 and 85 originally operated all the way between West Potomac Park & the Eastpine Shopping Center in Riverdale mostly operating via, Riverdale Road, Kenilworth Avenue, Edmonston Road, Annapolis Road, Bladensburg Road, and North Capitol Street, to Downtown Washington D.C. as streetcar routes and the first few years of being Metrobus routes in 1973.

On March 27, 1976, routes 84 & 85 were rerouted to make a turn from Rhode Island Avenue, onto the intersection of Washington Place to enter and serve the newly opened Rhode Island Avenue–Brentwood station. Routes 84 & 85 would then loop back onto Washington Place and then make a turn to get back onto Rhode Island Avenue and follow the rest of their routing along with routes 82, 83, & 86, the rest of the way from the Rhode Island Avenue–Brentwood station all the way up to West Potomac Park via Downtown Washington D.C. The routes would also serve Rhode Island when going Southbound.

On September 21, 1978, routes 82, 83, 86, 84, 85 were shorten to terminate at Rhode Island Avenue–Brentwood station only due to it being cost effective and duplicate to both the Red Line and other Metrobus routes. Passengers would have to transfer to either another Metrobus route or the Red Line to travel the rest of the way to Downtown Washington D.C. or West Potomac Park from Rhode Island Avenue–Brentwood station.

On November 21, 1978, when New Carrollton station opened, routes 84 & 85 were extended from their terminus at Eastpine Shopping Center, to New Carrollton station via Riverdale Road, Auburn Avenue, Good Luck Road, Lamont Drive, Carrollton Parkway, 85th Place, Powhatan Street, Westbrook Drive, 85th Avenue, West Lanham Drive, and Ellin Road. While route 84 would be the main route that operated seven days a week between Rhode Island Avenue–Brentwood station & New Carrollton, route 85 would operate during weekday peak hours that would only allow passengers to board in Washington D.C. and alight in Maryland. Route 84 would still serve the Eastpine Shopping Center terminal while route 85 will bypass the terminal inside the shopping center.

On December 30, 2007, route 85 was discontinued and replaced it with modified route 84 trips which would have the same restrictions as the route 85 trips, while allowing passengers to board in Washington D.C. and alight in Maryland. During that same time, route 84's diversion into the Eastpine Shopping Center was removed and route 84 was rerouted to follow 85's routing straight along Riverdale Road through the Eastpine Shopping Center.

On December 14, 2014, route 84 was renamed Route T14 keeping the same routing and discontinuing the 84 designation. WMATA also began a new limited-stop segment along Rhode Island Avenue between Mount Rainier terminal and Rhode Island Avenue-Brentwood station along with route T18. The limited stop segment was to reduce bus bunching along Rhode Island Avenue and improve on time performance for routes T14 and T18. Buses would only serve the following stops:
 Rhode Island Ave & 12th St NE
 Rhode Island Ave & Montana Ave NE (eastbound)/14th St NE (westbound)
 Rhode Island Ave & 18th St NE
 Rhode Island Ave & South Dakota Ave NE (eastbound)/24th St NE (westbound)
 Rhode Island Ave & Newton St NE
Passengers wishing for local service will have to use routes 83 or 86.

During the COVID-19 pandemic, the route was relegated to operate on its Saturday supplemental schedule beginning on March 16, 2020. However beginning on March 18, 2020, the route was further reduced to operate on its Sunday schedule. Also beginning on March 21, 2020, all weekend service was suspended. On August 23, 2020, route T14 was restored to its regular weekday schedule but with a reduced Saturday schedule and all Sunday schedule suspended.

On September 26, 2020, WMATA proposed to eliminate all route T14 Sunday service due to low federal funding in response to the COVID-19 pandemic. However, on March 14, 2021, route T14 Sunday service was restored.

References

T14